1,1′-Azobis(cyclohexanecarbonitrile) or ACHN is a radical initiator. The molecular formula is NCC6H10N=NC6H10CN. It is a white solid that is soluble in aromatic solvents.

ACHN has a 10-hour half-life in toluene at 88 °C.

See also
 Azobisisobutylonitrile (AIBN) is another commonly used free radical initiator

References

Azo compounds
Nitriles
Radical initiators